The Charlotte Harbor and Northern Railway is a historic railroad line that at its greatest extent serviced Gasparilla Island in Charlotte Harbor and a major shipping port that once operated there. The railroad's principal purpose was to transport phosphate mined along the Peace River and in the Bone Valley region of Central Florida to the port to be shipped.  It also brought passengers to the island community of Boca Grande on Gasparilla Island, and is largely responsible for making Boca Grande the popular tourist destination it is today.  Part of the line remains in service today between Mulberry and Arcadia, which is now owned and operated by CSX Transportation.  Today, it makes up CSX's Achan Subdivision and part of their Brewster Subdivision.

Route
At its greatest extent, the Charlotte Harbor and Northern Railway ran from Mulberry to the southern tip of Gasparilla Island, a distance of nearly 100 miles.  From Mulberry, the line proceeded south in a mostly straight trajectory through Bradley Junction, Fort Green Springs, and Ona to Arcadia.

What remains of the line today terminates in Arcadia, but historically it continued from Arcadia southwest, paralleling the Peace River and the adjacent Atlantic Coast Line Railroad (former Florida Southern Railway) through Nocatee and Fort Ogden.  Near Fort Ogden, the line crossed the river and continued southwest into southeastern Sarasota County and Port Charlotte, where it ran alongside of what is today Raintree Boulevard, Veterans Boulevard, and State Road 776 (which has since been widened into the former right of way).  It crossed the Myakka River in El Jobean and continued running south just northwest of what is today Gasparilla Road toward Placida and Gasparilla Island.

In Placida, the line crossed a causeway consisting of three major trestles onto Gasparilla Island, where it ran the length of the island and terminating at the Boca Grande port at the south end of the island near Port Boca Grande Lighthouse.

History

Early years

Large amounts of phosphate, a valuable commodity used in agriculture, were discovered along the Peace River in the late 1800s.  Transporting phosphate by ship down the Peace River was a slow and tedious process due to the river levels being low at some times.  The Florida Southern Railway (which later became part of the Atlantic Coast Line Railroad) operated tracks to Punta Gorda along the south side of the river, and it was also used to some extent to transport phosphate to its dock in Punta Gorda for shipment.

Boca Grande Pass, a natural deepwater inlet at the south end of Gasparilla Island, was seen as the perfect place for a deepwater port to simplify the process of shipping phosphate.  The Charlotte Harbor and Northern Railway was first chartered in 1897 as the Alafia, Manatee, and Gulf Coast Railroad.  Peter B. Bradley, who created the American Agricultural Chemicals Company, secured the charter for the line in 1905, and renamed it the Charlotte Harbor and Northern Railway.

By 1907, the line was completed between Boca Grande and Arcadia, where repair shops were located, as well as a connection to the Atlantic Coast Line Railroad's Lakeland—Fort Myers Line (the former Florida Southern Railway).  The Boca Grande port included a 3,000 foot dock for loading large vessels directly from railroad cars.  In addition to transporting freight, it also provided passenger service to Boca Grande, which was famous for its world-class tarpon fishing.  Three passenger depots existed on Gasparilla Island, with one at the north end of the island, one in downtown Boca Grande (which still stands), and one at the port at the south end of the island where boat connections could be made to nearby Useppa Island.  The line ran between Gasparilla Island and the mainland on a two-mile long causeway consisting of three trestles over Gasparilla Sound.  The trestles contained two steel swing spans built by Virginia Iron Works to accommodate vessel traffic.  The northernmost trestle's swing span would later be replaced by a bascule bridge.

By 1910, the line was extended north beyond Arcadia into the Bone Valley where a connection to the Seaboard Air Line Railroad's new spur from Plant City to Agricola was established.  This connection would become known as Bradley Junction (named after founder Peter B. Bradley).  In addition to penetrating more phosphate-rich regions of the state, the extension provided a shortcut for trains traveling between Boca Grande and Tampa.  A further extension north from Bradley Junction to phosphate mines in Mulberry was later built around 1912, which provided additional connections to both the Atlantic Coast Line Railroad (via their Bone Valley Branch) and Seaboard Air Line Railroad (via their Valrico Subdivision).  This final extension would also serve the now-defunct phosphate town called Pierce.

Seaboard Air Line ownership

In 1925, the line was leased by the Seaboard Air Line Railroad, who then fully purchased the line from the American Agricultural Chemicals Company a year later.  This gave Seaboard direct access to the Boca Grande port.  Almost immediately after the purchase, Seaboard began construction of a branch line from Hull (near Fort Ogden) to Fort Myers and Naples (via their Seaboard-All Florida Railway subsidiary).  That route was completed in 1927.  

Upon completion of the Fort Myers extension, the Seaboard Air Line operated the former Charlotte Harbor and Northern in three segments.  Track from Mulberry to Bradley Junction was designated as the Agricola Subdivision.  From Bradley Junction to Hull, the line was designated as the Fort Myers Subdivision (which also included Seaboard track north of Bradley Junction to Plant City and track to Fort Myers and Naples).  Track south of Hull became the Boca Grande Subdivision.  Seaboard passenger trains provided service on the line to both Boca Grande and to Fort Myers and Naples (the latter destinations were provided by Orange Blossom Special and West Coast Limited).  However, passenger service to Fort Myers ended in 1933 and track to there was abandoned by 1952.  By then, the Boca Grande Subdivision designation was expanded all the way to Bradley Junction.

By 1940, two daily local passenger trains were still running the line to Boca Grande.  Passenger service to Boca Grande was discontinued in 1958 shortly after the opening of the Boca Grande Causeway, which was the last passenger service to ever operate on the line.

Later years

The Seaboard Air Line Railroad merged with the Atlantic Coast Line Railroad in 1967.  The merged company became the Seaboard Coast Line Railroad.

Increased competition from the Rockport Terminal in the Tampa Bay area led to the closure of the Boca Grande Port in 1979.  The abandonment and removal of the line from the port to just south of Arcadia in 1981 was a direct result of the closure.

Despite its removal, evidence of the line can still be found on Gasparilla Island and Charlotte County.  Most of the right of way on Gasparilla Island was purchased by a local entrepreneur and converted into the popular Boca Grande Bike Path in 1985, which was the first rail trail in the state of Florida.  The Cape Haze Pioneer Trail was later built on the right of way between western Port Charlotte and Placida in the mid 2000s.

The most substantial remnant of the line is the historic Boca Grande passenger depot at Park and 4th Streets, which is listed on the U.S. National Register of Historic Places.  The depot was restored in the 1970s and today houses shops and a restaurant.  

A number of bridges along the abandoned route also remain to this day as well, the most notable of which is the causeway over Gasparilla Sound that connected the line to the island.  The southernmost trestle is now a fishing pier as is the northernmost trestle up to the abandoned drawbridge tower.  The rest of the causeway and trestles, which remain just to the south of the Boca Grande Causeway, are now completely abandoned.  The center trestle's swing span is still in place and is locked open to facilitate boat traffic.  The bascule span on the northernmost trestle was removed and reinstalled in 1988 over Reynolds Creek in Long Beach, New York on the Long Island Rail Road's Long Beach Branch, where it is still in service.

Other remaining bridges include trestles over the Myakka River and Coral Creek, which have been converted into fishing piers.

Current operations

Trackage between Mulberry and Arcadia is all that remains of the Charlotte Harbor and Northern Railway today.  It makes up CSX's Achan Subdivision from Mulberry to Bradley Junction, and the Brewster Subdivision from Bradley Junction to Arcadia (the Brewster Subdivision also includes the former Seaboard route from Bradley Junction to Edison). Seminole Gulf Railway operates the southernmost two miles of the line (which connects to their main line, the remaining Atlantic Coast Line route south to Punta Gorda, Fort Myers, and Bonita Springs).  CSX continues to use the line for transporting phosphate mined in the northern Bone Valley region and interchange traffic for Seminole Gulf.  The Brewster Subdivision is today CSX's second busiest route for phosphate traffic in the region (after the Valrico Subdivision).

The Legend of José Gaspar

In the early 1900s, the Railway produced an advertising brochure for its Gasparilla Inn near the end of the line on Gasparilla Island that claimed that the area was once home to José Gaspar, a renegade Spanish pirate who was supposedly based in Charlotte Harbor when Florida was still Spanish territory. The brochure claimed that Gaspar had been the most feared buccaneer of his generation during his 40-year career spent ravaging shipping and taking hostages across the Gulf of Mexico to the Spanish Main, that he named most of the islands in the Charlotte Harbor area, and had left an as-yet undiscovered treasure cache in the vicinity of the Gasparilla Inn upon his dramatic death in battle. The tale was unsupported by any evidence, and Pat Lemoyne, the publicist who wrote it, freely admitted in later years that "there was not a true fact in it" and that it was simply an advertisement written in the style of a romantic adventure to attract the attention of tourists. Still, the colorful legend of Gaspar presented in the brochure helped inspire the annual Gasparilla Pirate Festival in nearby Tampa and has led to ongoing confusion as to Gaspar's historic authenticity.

Gallery

Historic stations

Notes

References

1907 establishments in Florida
1925 disestablishments in Florida
Railway companies established in 1907
Defunct Florida railroads
Predecessors of the Seaboard Air Line Railroad
Seaboard Air Line Railroad